Arnaldo Balay (2 September 1928 – 28 September 2006) was an Argentine footballer. He played in three matches for the Argentina national football team from 1955 to 1958. He was also part of Argentina's squad for the 1955 South American Championship.

References

External links
 

1928 births
2006 deaths
Argentine footballers
Argentina international footballers
Association football defenders
Sportspeople from Buenos Aires Province
Ferro Carril Oeste footballers
Racing Club de Avellaneda footballers
Club Atlético Los Andes footballers